The 2018 Porsche Carrera Cup Asia was the sixteenth running of the Porsche Carrera Cup Asia series. It began on April 13 at the Shanghai International Circuit and finished on November 16 at the same circuit.

Teams and Drivers

Calendar 
The series contested of 12-rounds, which started at the Shanghai International Circuit on the 15th of April and concluded at the same circuit on the 18th of November.

Championship standings

Overall

Pro-Am

Dealer Trophy

References

External links
 

Porsche Carrera Cup Asia